Neotanypeza is a genus of flies in the family Tanypezidae.

Species
N. abdominalis (Wiedemann, 1830)
N. apicalis (Wiedemann, 1830)
N. callitarsis (Rondani, 1850)
N. claripennis (Schiner, 1868)
N. cubitofusca (Enderlein, 1936)
N. dallasi (Shannon, 1927)
N. dimorpha (Hennig, 1936)
N. elegans (Wiedemann, 1830)
N. elegantina (Enderlein, 1913)
N. flavibasis (Enderlein, 1936)
N. flavicalx (Enderlein, 1936)
N. flavitibia Hennig, 1936
N. flavohirta (Enderlein, 1913)
N. grandis (Enderlein, 1913)
N. mexicana (Giglio-Tos, 1893)
N. montana (Enderlein, 1936)
N. nigripalpis Hennig, 1936
N. ochrifemur (Enderlein, 1936)
N. ornatipes (Bigot, 1886)
N. pallidipennis (Bigot, 1886)
N. quadrisetosa (Enderlein, 1913)
N. rufiventris (Enderlein, 1936)
N. rutila (Wulp, 1897)

References

Nerioidea genera
Nerioidea
Taxa named by Friedrich Georg Hendel